Kevin Andrew Bridges (born 13 November 1986) is a Scottish stand-up comedian. His 2012 television series Kevin Bridges: What's the Story? was based on his stand-up routines.

He has appeared on many television panel shows including Would I Lie to You?, Have I Got News for You and has performed on Live at the Apollo and Michael McIntyre's Comedy Roadshow.

Career

Stand-up
Bridges began performing on stage when he left school shortly after turning 17, doing stand-up comedy gigs at The Stand Comedy Club in Glasgow and then throughout the UK. Bridges said he was inspired to try stand up after reading Frank Skinner's autobiography. At 18, he reached the final of Channel 5's So You Think You're Funny competition at the Edinburgh Fringe. In 2006, Bridges performed his first full-length solo show at the Glasgow International Comedy Festival, to a sold-out audience and much critical acclaim. Moving into bigger venues every year, Bridges sold out his hometown festival in 2007, 2008 and 2009. He performed at the 2008 Edinburgh Festival Fringe.

Bridges appeared on Michael McIntyre's Comedy Roadshow on the BBC, where he performed at the Edinburgh Playhouse. Bridges returned to the Edinburgh Festival Fringe in 2009 with his show 'An Hour to Sing For Your Soul'. He was nominated for best newcomer in the Edinburgh Comedy Awards.

In 2010, Bridges took part in Channel 4's Comedy Gala, a benefit show held in aid of Great Ormond Street Children's Hospital, filmed live at the O2 Arena in London. Bridges won the breakthrough award at the 2010 Chortle Awards.

His debut DVD, titled Kevin Bridges: The Story So Far... Live in Glasgow, filmed at Glasgow's SECC, was released on 22 November 2010, and went on to sell over 350,000 copies. 

In 2012, Bridges embarked on his second stand-up tour of the UK, The Story Continues. The tour broke box office records, selling out the SECC five times and selling over 45,000 tickets on the first day. Bridges would perform 136 dates during the tour included ten sell out shows at the SECC in Glasgow. His second DVD, titled The Story Continues... was released on 12 November 2012. 

In 2015, Bridges embarked on his third stand-up tour of the UK, A Whole Different Story. The tour saw Bridges sell over 500,000 tickets across 145 dates including 16 sell out shows at The Hydro in his home city of Glasgow. During which he recorded his third DVD which went on to sell over 300,000 copies. Including 40,000 during its first week on sale outselling fellow comedians Michael McIntyre and John Bishop.

Bridges became disillusioned with stand-up after his 145 night tour in 2015. After having a chat with his dad, he decided to take a break from performing. During his time in Spain, he cleared his head and was inspired by the freedom he had to return to stand-up. When Bridges returned from Spain, he did "three or four" unannounced work-in-progress gigs to test out his new material.

After over a year away from stand-up, Bridges returned in 2018 with his Brand New Tour which included a record 19 sold out nights at The Hydro. Bridges was awarded the 'Gie it Laldy' award by the CEO of the Scottish Event Campus, in recognition for playing forty-six shows across the SEC Centre and The Hydro. He has also sold more tickets for the Scottish Event Campus than any other solo artist. His Brand New Tour was also voted the UK's Ticket of The Year in a poll conducted by Ticketmaster. Bridges is the first comedian to top the annual poll voted for by Ticketmaster customers.

Television
Bridges' television career started on Comedy Central UK, in April 2008, with a set on The World Stands Up. Shortly thereafter, he appeared on Comedy Store (also on Comedy Central). His performances on these shows and on the comedy circuit and at festivals led to his being given his first mainstream TV break on 5 June 2009 on BBC One's Michael McIntyre's Comedy Roadshow. Bridges was critically commended for his performance. Over 5 million viewers saw his debut and his entire 25-night run at the Edinburgh festival sold out in hours, with extra shows being subsequently added and also selling out. Bridges went on to be nominated for the 2009 Edinburgh Comedy Awards (formerly Perrier) in the best newcomer category.

His TV work since then has included BBC One's Live at the Apollo and also a "Best of British Special" (Episode 7 of the 8th series) of 8 out of 10 Cats, in July 2009. He also appeared in BBC 2 Scotland's Gary: Tank Commander (episode 6). Bridges appeared in Rab C Nesbitt in the first episode of the new series in 2010, on Mock the Week in February 2010, and has appeared twice in Would I Lie To You?. He was a guest on the BBC One show Friday Night with Jonathan Ross on 28 May 2010. Since June 2010, Bridges is a regular performer on Channel 4's Stand Up for the Week. His six-part BBC One series, Kevin Bridges: What's the Story?, began on 8 February 2012. Bridges was asked to appear in I'm a Celebrity...Get Me Out of Here, but turned it down.

In 2014 BBC One commissioned three specials hosted by Bridges. Live At The Commonwealth, filmed at the Glasgow's Theatre Royal to coincide with the city hosting the 2014 Commonwealth Games, featured internationally renowned comedians from the Commonwealth. Live At The Referendum, also filmed at the Theatre Royal, brought together four of the UK's top comedians to give their views on the 2014 Scottish independence referendum. In the third special, Kevin Bridges: What's The Story – Referendum Special, Bridges took to the streets gathering grassroots opinions from across Scotland and beyond about the referendum.

Radio
On 6 March 2010, Bridges took part in the BBC 5 Live show Fighting Talk, where he came second behind Greg Brady, becoming the youngest person ever to appear on the show at the time (a record since broken by fellow comedian Jack Whitehall). In November 2010, he was also a contestant on BBC Radio 4's The Unbelievable Truth.

Personal life
Bridges is the son of Andy and Patricia Bridges and has a brother, John, who is ten years older. He grew up in the Hardgate area of Clydebank and attended St Mary's Primary and St Columba's High. 

Kevin married his wife Kerry Monaghan in 2019. In December of 2022, Bridges announced the birth of his first child, a son named Liam, born in May of that year.

Filmography

Stand-up DVDs

Awards and nominations

|-
! scope="row" | 2012
| Kevin Bridges: What's the Story?
| Best Writer
|

Bibliography

Non-fiction
We Need to Talk About . . . Kevin Bridges (Penguin, 2014)

Novels
The Black Dog (Wildfire, 2022)

References

External links

Scottish male comedians
Scottish stand-up comedians
Living people
1986 births
People from Clydebank
Alumni of Glasgow Caledonian University
21st-century Scottish comedians